The European Speedway Club Champions' Cup is an annual speedway event held in different clubs organized by the European Motorcycle Union (UEM) since 1998.

Previous winners

Medals classification

References

See also
 Motorcycle speedway

 
Clubs